Avgi (Αυγή 'dawn') may refer to:

I Avgi, a Greek newspaper
Avgi, Kastoria, a village in the Kastoria regional unit, Greece
Avgi, Kozani, a village in the Kozani regional unit, Greece 
Avgi, Elis, a village in the municipal unit Pineia, Elis, Greece
 Avgi, Thessaloniki, Greece

See also
 Auge, the classical transliteration of the same word